Athoracophorus is a genus of air-breathing, land slugs, terrestrial pulmonate gastropod molluscs in the family Athoracophoridae.

Species 
Species in the genus Athoracophorus include:
 Athoracophorus bitentaculatus (Quoy & Gaimard, 1832)
 Athoracophorus maculosus Burton, 1963
 Athoracophorus suteri Burton, 1963

Description 
The body of the animal is limaciform, subcylindrical and tapering behind; inferior tentacles wanting. Mantle is anterior, small, triangular, lateral, adherent, enclosing the shell-plate. There are no longitudinal furrows above the margin of the foot, and no caudal mucous pit. There is no distinct locomotive disk. External respiratory and anal orifices are on the right central margin of the mantle. Orifice of the combined
genital system is behind and below the right eye-peduncle.

The shell-plate is internal, flat, calcareous, oblong and sometimes in separate grains.

Jaw is smooth, with median projection and quadrate accessory plate.

Lingual membrane is with peculiarly shaped teeth, with long, narrow, curving, base of attachment, and low, transverse, multifid cusp.

The animal has peculiar dorsal grooves.

References 
This article incorporates public domain text from reference.

  Mollusca & shells. By Augustus A. Gould; Philadelphia,Printed by C. Sherman,1852-56 (i.e. 1862)

External links 
 Drawing of Athoracophorus hirudo

Athoracophoridae